Echoes is an album by guitarist Joshua Breakstone that was recorded in 1986 and first released by the Contemporary label.

Reception 

In his review on AllMusic, Scott Yanow states "Guitarist Joshua Breakstone gained some initial recognition for this recording, his first for a medium-size label (following two sets for the tiny Sonora company). Breakstone welcomes two major players (baritonist Pepper Adams and pianist Kenny Barron) to a bop-oriented program ... There are fine solos all around, particularly from Pepper Adams, who only had eight months left to live. Worth searching for".

Track listing 
 "Oblivion" (Bud Powell) – 6:16
 "It's Easy to Remember" (Richard Rodgers, Lorenz Hart) – 11:00
 "My Heart Stood Still" (Rodgers, Hart) – 5:56
 "Even Steven" (Barry Harris) – 7:07
 "To Monk with Love" (Harris) – 6:22
 "Bird Song" (Thad Jones) – 7:15

Personnel 
Joshua Breakstone – guitar
Pepper Adams – baritone saxophone
Kenny Barron – piano
Dennis Irwin – bass 
Keith Copeland – drums

References 

Joshua Breakstone albums
1987 albums
Contemporary Records albums